Filippo Gerosa (Forlimpopoli, 26 October 1991) is an Italian rugby union player.
His usual position is as a Lock and he currently plays for Valorugby Emilia in Top12.

In 2014–15 Pro12 season, he was named like Additional Player for Zebre and in 2015–16 Pro12 season for Benetton Treviso. In 2016–17 Pro12, he also played for Benetton Treviso all the season.

After playing for Italy Under 20 in 2011, from 2014 to 2016, he also was named in the Emerging Italy squad.

References

External links 
It's Rugby English Profile
Eurosport Profile
ESPN Profile

Sportspeople from the Province of Forlì-Cesena
Italian rugby union players
1991 births
Living people
Valorugby Emilia players
Rugby union locks
Petrarca Rugby players
Benetton Rugby players
Cavalieri Prato players